Individual Emotion is Aya Kamiki's fourth album and her first under her new label Avex Trax, released simultaneously alongside her first greatest hits album Aya Kamiki Greatest Best. The only single from the album is "W-B-X ~W-Boiled Extreme~", the opening theme song for Kamen Rider W. The first disc, included in the standard and limited edition releases, is a normal studio album. The second disc, only included with the limited edition releases, is a compilation of several non-album B-sides and album only tracks selected by Kamiki's fans.

Track listing

References

External links
INDIVIDUAL EMOTION on Aya Kamiki's official website

2010 albums
Aya Kamiki albums